Sven Butenschön (born March 22, 1976) is a German-Canadian ice hockey coach and a former professional ice hockey defenceman who is currently serving as head coach at the University of British Columbia.

Butenschön has spent parts of eight seasons in the National Hockey League. He played several years in Germany and represented the German national team at two World Championships and the 2010 Olympic Games.

Playing career
Born in Itzehoe, Germany, Butenschön grew up in Winnipeg. His family had left Germany when he was two years of age. He played his junior hockey with the Brandon Wheat Kings of the WHL, and was drafted 57th overall by the Pittsburgh Penguins in the 1994 NHL Entry Draft. After two more seasons in Brandon, he turned pro in 1996 and spent his entire first professional season in the AHL with the Cleveland Lumberjacks.

Butenschön would spend five seasons in the Penguins organization, during which time he was usually the first callup from the farm when injuries hit, but was never able to establish himself as a regular. He made his NHL debut in 1997–98 campaign, appearing in 8 games for the Penguins without recording a point, and saw action in Pittsburgh in each of the next four seasons, including a high of 17 games in 1998–99. Primarily a defensive defender, he surprised with a big offensive season in the minors in 1999–2000, as he registered 19 goals and 40 points for the Wilkes-Barre/Scranton Penguins.

At the trade deadline near the end of the 2000–01 season, Butenschön was dealt to the Edmonton Oilers, and appeared in 7 games with the Oilers late in the season, recording his first NHL goal. However, he found himself back in the AHL for  2001–02, appearing in just 14 games for the Oilers.

In the summer of 2002, Butenschön was traded to the New York Islanders, where he would have the most successful portion of his career. In 2002–03, he played in a career-high 37 games for the Islanders, recording 4 assists. In 2003–04, he spent virtually the entire season in the NHL as the Islanders' 7th defender, playing in 41 games and recording 1 goal and 6 assists for a career high 7 points.

Butenschön signed with Adler Mannheim in the DEL during the 2004–05 NHL lockout, recording 1 goal and 6 points in 50 games. For 2005–06, he returned to North America, signing a one-year deal with the Vancouver Canucks. He enjoyed another fine season in the AHL, scoring 15 goals and 37 points for the Manitoba Moose, and appeared in 8 games for Vancouver.

Butenschön returned to Adler Mannheim when he became an unrestricted free agent in 2006, and recorded 3 goals and 6 points for the Eagles in 2006–07.

After five seasons in Mannheim, Butenschön signed with another German team, the Thomas Sabo Ice Tigers, on May 16, 2011. He spent two years with the Ice Tigers and retired after the 2012-13 season.

International play 
Butenschön made his debut on the German national team in November 2008 and played the 2009 and 2010 World Championships with the team, reaching the semi final in 2010. He also made four appearances for Germany at the 2010 Olympic Games in Vancouver.

Coaching career 
Butenschön worked as lead instructor at Leslie Global Sports from 2013 to 2015.

In 2015, he joined the coaching staff of the University of British Columbia men's ice hockey team as an assistant and was promoted to the head coaching job in September 2016.

Career statistics

Regular season and playoffs

International

Awards and honors

Transactions 
On June 29, 1994 the Pittsburgh Penguins drafted Butenschön in the third round (#57 overall) of the 1994 NHL draft.
On March 13, 2001 the Pittsburgh Penguins traded Butenschön to the Edmonton Oilers in exchange for Dan LaCouture.
On July 9, 2002 the Florida Panthers signed Butenschön as an unrestricted free agent.
On October 11, 2002 the Florida Panthers traded Butenschön to the New York Islanders in exchange for Juraj Kolnik and a 2003 ninth-round pick (#276-Carter Lee).
On August 2, 2004 the Adler Mannheim signed Butenschön as a free agent.
On August 22, 2005 the Vancouver Canucks signed Butenschön as an unrestricted free agent.
On June 19, 2006 the Adler Mannheim signed Butenschön as a free agent.

See also

 List of German Canadians

References

External links
 

1976 births
Living people
People from Itzehoe
Brandon Wheat Kings players
Canadian ice hockey defencemen
Edmonton Oilers players
German expatriates in the United States
German emigrants to Canada
Ice hockey players at the 2010 Winter Olympics
Manitoba Moose players
New York Islanders players
Olympic ice hockey players of Germany
Pittsburgh Penguins draft picks
Pittsburgh Penguins players
Vancouver Canucks players
Bridgeport Sound Tigers players
Cleveland Lumberjacks players
Hamilton Bulldogs (AHL) players
Houston Aeros (1994–2013) players
Thomas Sabo Ice Tigers players
Syracuse Crunch players
Wilkes-Barre/Scranton Penguins players
Canadian ice hockey coaches
Adler Mannheim players
University of British Columbia
Canadian expatriate ice hockey players in Germany
Sportspeople from Schleswig-Holstein